Slabčice is a municipality and village in Písek District in the South Bohemian Region of the Czech Republic. It has about 400 inhabitants.

Administrative parts
Villages of Březí, Nemějice and Písecká Smoleč are administrative parts of Slabčice.

References

Villages in Písek District